The C-5 Southlink Expressway, signed as E2 of the Philippine expressway network, is a  controlled-access toll expressway in Metro Manila connecting the Manila–Cavite Expressway (CAVITEX) to the Circumferential Road 5 (C-5) in Taguig. Currently operational between Taguig and  near E. Rodriguez Avenue in Parañaque only, its remaining segment up to CAVITEX is currently under construction.

Route description 
C-5 Southlink Expressway starts at Carlos P. Garcia Avenue (C-5) in Taguig near its interchange with South Luzon Expressway (SLEX). It then ascends as the existing flyover that crosses Skyway, the Philippine National Railway tracks, SLEX and the at-grade expressway's service roads before descending along C-5 Extension, which serves as its frontage roads, in Pasay. It then continues its course south of Ninoy Aquino International Airport until it meets its current terminus at C-5 Road Extension in Parañaque, near a Shell station.

The expressway's section towards Manila–Cavite Expressway (CAVITEX) is currently under construction. It will continue its course south of the airport. It will then pass by Amvel City, where an interchange towards Sucat Road and a toll plaza will be located. It will end at a trumpet interchange with CAVITEX near the latter's Parañaque toll plaza.

History  
The original south extension of Circumferential Road 5, called Manila–Cavite Toll Expressway Project (MCTEP), was already approved by the Senate and would have been made as a toll expressway. However, in 2010, the project was scrapped in favor of the toll-free C-5 Road Extension that was controversial for traversing several of then-Senator Manny Villar's properties in Parañaque and Las Piñas. The toll expressway project was later revived as the C-5 Southlink Expressway project.

The construction of the expressway started on May 8, 2016. The expressway is being built in two phases, with the first phase that fills the gap between the C-5 main route and the C-5 Extension near Merville, Parañaque by constructing a  flyover over South Luzon Expressway and Skyway, and the second phase involving construction of the Merville–R-1 segments. Phase 1 or Section 3A-1 (C-5 to Merville) was opened to traffic on July 23, 2019. The flyover's  extension called Segment 3A-2 (Merville to E. Rodriguez) opened on August 14, 2022, with the Merville Exit opening later in October 2022. The entire project is expected to be completed in 2023.

Toll 
The expressway currently uses a barrier toll system wherein motorists pay a fixed toll rate upon exit.  Integrated with the toll system of CAVITEX, the electronic toll collection (ETC) system on the expressway is operated by Easytrip Services Corporation and collections are done on both dedicated lanes and mixed lanes at the toll barriers.

Tolls are assessed in each direction at each barrier, based on class. In accordance with the law, all toll rates include a 12% value-added tax.

Exits

References

External links 
 Cavite Expressway

Toll roads in the Philippines
Roads in Metro Manila